Francis Edward Wilkins (1864 in St. Louis, Missouri – 1908 in Lacombe, Alberta) was a former politician in Northwest Territories, Canada.

Francis moved with his family to a homestead near Red Deer in 1890.

Francis was acclaimed to the Legislative Assembly of Northwest Territories in the 1891 Northwest Territories general election after Robert Brett the incumbent decided to run in the new Banff riding.

Francis was defeated after serving one term in the 1894 Northwest Territories general election finishing last in a 3 way contest.

Francis ran for Mayor in the 1905 Mayoral race for the city of Red Deer, Alberta Francis was defeated by incumbent Mayor Edward Michener by 8 votes.

He died in 1908.

External links
History of the Northwest Territories Legislative Assembly 1876 - 1905
City of Red Deer Mayoralty  elections 1901 - 2004
Alberta pioneer profiles Francis Wilkins

1864 births
1908 deaths
Members of the Legislative Assembly of the Northwest Territories